Cooksonia aliciae is a butterfly in the family Lycaenidae. It is found in Malawi.

References

Butterflies described in 1935
Poritiinae
Endemic fauna of Malawi
Butterflies of Africa